Clinton Day (March 17, 1847 - January 11, 1916) was a noted architect active on the west coast of the United States.

Day was born in Brooklyn, and moved to California when 8 years old. His grandfather, Jeremiah Day, was president of Yale University, and his father, Sherman Day, was surveyor-general of California and one of the founders of the College of California, predecessor to the University of California, Berkeley. Day graduated from the College of California in 1868, and received his MA from the same institution in 1874. (He later received an honorary LLD from the college in 1910.) In 1875, he married Grace Wakefield from Cambridge, Massachusetts.

As an architect, he designed some of San Francisco's finest buildings, including the City of Paris building, Union Trust building, and Gump's department store; and a number of fine houses in Oakland, California, including the Treadwell Mansion. He designed Architecture Building and Metallurgical Laboratory at the University of California, Berkeley. He was a Fellow of the American Institute of Architects. Clinton was the great-grandson of American founding father Roger Sherman.

References 

 Obituary in The Architect and Engineer of California, Vol. XLIV, No. 1, January, 1916, pages 87–88.
 Archives, University of California, Berkeley
 NoeHill in San Francisco - Bay Area Architects: Clinton Day
 Clinton Day Bio PCAD
 First Church Berkeley UCC
 Stable at East Oakland, 1884
 Bancroft Building
 Treadwell Mansion
 archINFORM Bio
 City of Paris Building

19th-century American architects
20th-century American architects
Architects from New York City
Architects from California
People from Brooklyn
University of California, Berkeley alumni
Fellows of the American Institute of Architects
1847 births
1916 deaths